East Mountain may refer to:

Elevations
 East Mountain (Massachusetts), in Hampden County
 East Mountain, a summit of the Brodie Mountain ridgeline, in Berkshire County, Massachusetts
 East Mountains (Bernalillo County, New Mexico), in Bernalillo County, New Mexico
 East Mountain (Ulster County, New York)
 East Mountain (Utah), one of Utah's mountains
 East Mountain (Essex County, Vermont)

Settlements
East Mountain, Texas, a city in Upshur County
East Mountain (Waterbury), a section of Waterbury, Connecticut

See also
 Eastmont (disambiguation)